The Stonington Formation is a geologic formation in Michigan. It preserves fossils dating back to the Ordovician period.

See also

 List of fossiliferous stratigraphic units in Michigan

References

 

Ordovician System of North America
Ordovician Michigan
Ordovician southern paleotropical deposits
Upper Ordovician Series